One Morning in May may refer to:

 "One Morning in May" (folk song), traditional folk song
 "One Morning in May" (1933 song), jazz standard by Hoagy Carmichael and Mitchell Parish
 One Morning in May (album), 2001 jazz album by Bucky Pizzarelli